Art Garfunkel is an American singer, best known for participating  with Paul Simon in the folk duo Simon & Garfunkel. Garfunkel released ten studio albums, one live album, four compilation albums and twenty-nine singles.

To date, Garfunkel has had three US top 40 albums and six UK top 40 Albums, with two in the top 10, respectively.  As a solo artist, he also hit the top ten on the US Billboard Hot 100 singles chart in 1973 with the song "All I Know."

Albums

Studio albums

Compilation albums

Live albums

Singles

Soundtrack appearances
 1989 – Sing, "We'll Never Say Goodbye"
 1992 – A League of Their Own, "Two Sleepy People"
 1998 – As Good as It Gets, "Always Look on the Bright Side of Life"
 1998 – Arthur and Friends: The First Almost Real Not Live CD (or Tape), "The Ballad of Buster Baxter"

Notes

References

External links
 

Discographies of American artists
Folk music discographies